Alex Lee may refer to:

Alex Lee (Australian footballer) (1908–1996), Australian rules footballer
Alex Lee (musician) (born 1970), English musician
Alex Lee (comedian) (born 1986/7), Australian comedian, actor, and television presenter
Alex Lee (Guamanian footballer) (born 1990), Guamanian soccer player
Alex Lee (television personality) (born 1992), English participant on Big Brother TV series
Alex Lee (politician) (born 1995), American politician from California
Alex Lee Inc., an American grocery retailer, wholesaler, and distributor

See also
Alexander Lee (disambiguation)